Monocacy is a passenger rail station on the MARC Brunswick Line between Washington, D.C. and Frederick, MD. This station is one of two stations on the Frederick extension. It is also the only station on the Brunswick Line other than Union Station to have a high-level platform. There is also a low level platform at the north end of the station.

Monocacy station is located at 7800 Genstar Drive, a cul-de-sac with a large parking lot off the east side of Maryland Route 355 in Frederick, Maryland. It was built on the old Frederick Branch of the Baltimore and Ohio Railroad. The architects of Cochran, Stephenson & Donkervoet, Inc. designed the small station to resemble B&O stations from the past.

Station layout

Bus connections
MTA Maryland Commuter Bus
Route 204
Route 515

TransIT Services of Frederick
TransIT Route 20
TransIT Route 10(By request only)

History
Monocacy Station, served at the time by the Baltimore and Ohio Railroad, played a brief but key role during John Brown's 1859 raid on the Federal Armory in nearby Harpers Ferry, Virginia (since 1863, West Virginia). Because John Brown's rebels cut the Railroad's telegraph line, no news of the rebellion reached Baltimore, the Railroad's center of operations, for several hours. The one train Brown eventually let proceed through Harpers Ferry and over the B & O Railroad Potomac River Crossing into Maryland stopped at Monocacy, which was the next station with staff and a telegraph, something not available in the stations at the hamlets of Sandy Hook, Maryland, and Point of Rocks, Maryland. The conductor stopped the train and sent a message about the abolitionist rebellion to B&O headquarters. After confirming it, the Railroad notified President James Buchanan, Virginia Governor Henry A. Wise, and other officials about the raid/revolt, beginning the operation to suppress it.

References

External links
 Monocacy station official website

2001 establishments in Maryland
Brunswick Line
Transportation buildings and structures in Frederick County, Maryland
MARC Train stations
Railway stations in the United States opened in 2001